The righteous perishes are the words with which the 57th chapter of the Book of Isaiah starts. In Christianity, Isaiah 57:1–2 is associated with the death of Christ, leading to liturgical use of the text at Tenebrae: the 24th responsory for Holy Week, "Ecce quomodo moritur justus" (See how the just dies), is based on this text. More generally, the text is associated with the death of loved ones and is used at burials. As such, and in other versions and translations, the Bible excerpt has been set to music.

Text

 contain awkward shifts between singular and plural, contrasting a group whom the prophetic tradition approves and others who are strongly condemned.
  The righteous perishes,
 And no man takes it to heart;
 Merciful men are taken away,
 While no one considers
 That the righteous is taken away from evil.
  He shall enter into peace;
 They shall rest in their beds,
 Each one walking in his uprightness.
"The righteous" (KJV, NASB, NIV, NKJV, NLT, NRSV): or "the just man" (NAB); "Good people" (TEV); "The godly" (NET Bible).
"Evil" or "the face of evil"
These verses complain the (apparently violent) death of the righteous that went 'unnoticed and unlamented'.

Responsory "Ecce quomodo moritur justus"

Settings of the responsory are included in Tomás Luis de Victoria's Officium Hebdomadae Sanctae, Carlo Gesualdo's Responsoria et alia ad Officium Hebdomadae Sanctae spectantia, Jan Dismas Zelenka's Responsoria pro hebdomada sancta (ZWV 55) and Franz Liszt's Responsorien und Antiphonen (S.30).

A 16th century motet by Marc'Antonio Ingegneri on the Latin text was published around 1967 in an arrangement by Maynard Klein and with "Behold how the righteous perish" as English translation. Palestrina set the responsory for two sopranos, alto and choir.

Jacob Handl (Jacobus Gallus) published his setting of Ecce quomodo moritur justus as No. VIII under the heading "De Passione Domini Nostri Iesv Christi" (On the Passion of Jesus Christ our Lord) in his Opus Musicum II. The subtitle of the 1587 publication reads "Qvae Ex Sancto Catholicae Ecclesiae Vsv Ita Svnt Dispositae, vt omni tempore inseruire queant" (Which are herewith offered for use in the Catholic Church, in such fashion that they can be adopted throughout the liturgical year). The Versus in Handl's setting is different from the Versus of the 24th Tenebrae responsory.

As in 17th century France the Tenebrae services, including the Répons de ténèbres, were held at the vespers of the preceding evening, for example Marc-Antoine Charpentier's Ecce quomodo, H 131 is part of his Répons de ténèbres du Vendredi saint (Tenebrae responsories of Good Friday).

In the 18th century Georg Reutter produced a SATB setting of the responsory for the ceremonies of the Holy Week in the Wiener Hofburgkapelle (Vienna court chapel). Another SATB setting was composed by Franz Joseph Aumann, to which an accompaniment by three trombones was added by Bruckner in 1879.

In the 20th century Francis Poulenc included "Ecce quomodo moritur justus" as the last in his Sept répons des ténèbres, FP 181, composed 1961.

The Episcopal Church provides a single Tenebrae service on Wednesday evening, the day before Maundy Thursday. That service reduces the total number of Tenebrae lessons, each followed by a responsory, to nine. Ecce quomodo moritur is the sixth responsory, and it follows after a reading from Augustine's commentary on Psalm 55 (54).

In Lutheranism
Isaiah 57:1–2 was a theme for funeral sermons of the Reformation, among others at a funeral service for Martin Luther in Eisleben.  It also, along with Isaiah 53 and Isaiah 63: 1–3, was used in the context of the Passion story.

Handl's Ecce quomodo moritur justus
Jacob Handl's Ecce quomodo moritur justus motet was sung at Protestant burials in the 16th century. In 1682, Gottfried Vopelius published Handl's motet with a singable German translation ("Siehe, wie dahin stirbt der Gerechte") in the Neu Leipziger Gesangbuch, for performance on Good Friday. Handl's motet was performed on Good Friday in Protestant churches in Wrocław and Leipzig. The music of Handl's setting, by that time perceived as a Protestant funeral motet, is quoted in George Frideric Handel's Funeral Anthem for Queen Caroline, HWV 264.

Der Gerechte kömmt um

Der Gerechte kömmt um, a chorus appearing in a pasticcio Passion oratorio from the early 1750s, has a German version of Isaiah 57:1–2 as text. It is an arrangement attributed to Johann Sebastian Bach of a SSATB setting of Tristis est anima mea, a motet attributed to Johann Kuhnau. The arrangement may have been a stand-alone funeral motet.

References

Sources

Bible quotes
 Vulgate: Isaias 57:1–2 and 53:7–8 at Wikisource.
 World English Bible (WEB):  at Wikisource

Other
 Augustine of Hippo. Exposition on Psalm 64 (63). at 
 Bach Digital. Der Gerechte kömmt um BWV deest; BC C 8 (= BC D 10/3)
 BnF. Répons de ténèbres du Vendredi saint. 6e répons. H 131 by Marc Antoine Charpentier
 Catholic Church The Complete Office of Holy Week According to the Roman Missal and Breviary, in Latin and English, pp. 400–401 Benziger brothers, 1875
Church Publishing The Book of Occasional Services • 2003, pp. 74–83. New York, 2004.  
 Clifford Bartlett (editor). George Frideric Handel: Israel in Egypt Part I – The Ways of Zion do Mourn Carus Verlag No. 55.264, 2008.
 
 
 CPDL. Ecce quomodo moritur justus by Jacob Handl at Choral Public Domain Library (ChoralWiki)
 Jacobus Gallus (Jacob Handl). Opus Musicum II (Secvndvs Tomvs. Mvsici Operis, Harmoniarvm Qvatvor, Qvinqve, Sex, Octo Et Plvrivm Vocvm : Qvae Ex Sancto Catholicae Ecclesiae Vsv Ita Svnt Dispositae, vt omni tempore inseruire queant. Ad Dei Opt: Max: laudem, et Ecclesiae sanctae decus / Avthore Iacobo Hándl / Pragae, Typis Nigrinianis. Anno M.D.LXXXVII). Jiří Nigrin, Prague, 1587.
 Carlo Gesualdo. 
 Harold Gleason, Warren Becker, Catherine Gleason. Music in the Middle Ages and Renaissance, p. 174. Alfred Music Publishing, 1988.  
 Prosper Guéranger, translated by Laurence Shepherd. Passiontide and Holy Week, Volume VI of The Liturgical Year, pp. 533–534. Dublin, 1870.
 Jacob Handl (Jacobus Gallus). 
 Uwe Harten, Anton Bruckner. Ein Handbuch. , Salzburg, 1996. .
 Tomasz Jeż. "The Motets of Jacob Handl in Inter-confessional Silesian Liturgical Practice" in De musica disserenda III/2, 2007, pp. 37–48
 Reinhold Kainhofer (editor). Ecce quomodo moritur by Georg Reutter. Vienna: Edition Kainhofer, 2009.
 Maynard Klein. Behold how the righteous perish : motet / Marco Ingegneri ; arr. Maynard Klein ; English text, M.K. at the website of the National Library of Australia
 Franz Liszt. 
 Elsie Anne McKee. Katharina Schütz Zell. 1. The life and thought of a sixteenth-century reformer, p. 127. BRILL, 1999.  
 
 
 Giovanni Pierluigi da Palestrina. 
 Melvin P. Unger. Historical Dictionary of Choral Music, p. 175. Scarecrow Press, 2010.  
 Tomás Luis de Victoria 
 Carl Ferdinand Wilhelm Walther. Sermons and prayers for Reformation and Luther commemorations, p. 161. Joel Baseley, 2008.  
 Jan Dismas Zelenka Ecce quomodo at

External links
 

Book of Isaiah
Hebrew Bible words and phrases
Tenebrae